The Animal Crush Video Prohibition Act of 2010, was a United States bill that addressed the banning of depictions of cruelty to animals to satisfy a crush fetish. The bill, was introduced by Rep. Elton Gallegly (R-CA), and primarily modified .

Background

The act revised the version of 18 U.S.C. § 48 that had entered into effect on December 9, 1999, which had been ruled an unconstitutional abridgment of the First Amendment right to freedom of speech  by the Supreme Court. In 2010, the Supreme Court ruled that the law was too vague and broad in United States v. Stevens, and, in an 8–1 decision, it nullified the 1999 law.

See also
 Foot fetishism
 Macrophilia

References

Acts of the 111th United States Congress
Cruelty to animals
Foot fetishism